Tipperary is a parliamentary constituency that has been represented in Dáil Éireann, the lower house of the Irish parliament or Oireachtas, since the 2016 general election. The constituency elects 5 deputies (Teachtaí Dála, commonly known as TDs) on the system of proportional representation by means of the single transferable vote (PR-STV). A constituency of the same name existed between 1923 and 1948.

History and boundaries

The constituency was created under the Electoral Act 1923, and was first used at the 1923 general election, incorporating the separate counties of North Tipperary and South Tipperary. It was abolished in 1948. The Constituency Commission proposed in its 2012 report that at the next general election a new constituency called Tipperary be created, as part of changes that reduced the total number of TDs from 166 to 158. This occurred in 2016, shortly after the administrative amalgamation in 2014 of the separate counties to form County Tipperary.

TDs

TDs 1923–1948

TDs since 2016

Elections

2020 general election

On 3 February 2020, following the death of independent candidate, Marese Skehan, the election in the Tipperary constituency was due to be postponed, with nominations to be re-opened. However, on 5 February the Minister for Housing, Planning and Local Government issued a Special Difficulty Order allowing the election to proceed on the same date as other constituencies. This was in consideration of the constitutional requirement that elections take place within 30 days of the dissolution of the Dáil.

2016 general election

1947 by-election
Following the death of Clann na Talmhan TD William O'Donnell, a by-election was held on 29 October 1947. The seat was won by the Clann na Poblachta candidate Patrick Kinane.

1944 general election

1943 general election

1938 general election

1937 general election

1933 general election

1932 general election

September 1927 general election

June 1927 general election

1923 general election

See also
Elections in the Republic of Ireland
Politics of the Republic of Ireland
List of Dáil by-elections
List of political parties in the Republic of Ireland

References

Dáil constituencies
Politics of County Tipperary
1923 establishments in Ireland
1948 disestablishments in Ireland
Constituencies established in 1923
Constituencies disestablished in 1948
2016 establishments in Ireland
Constituencies established in 2016